Botswana has a network of roads, of varied quality and capacity, totaling about . Other these,  are paved (this is including  of motorways. The reminder  worth are unpaved. Road distances are shown in kilometers and Botswana speed limits are indicated in kilometers per hour (kph) or by the use of the national speed limit (NSL) symbol. Some vehicle categories have various lower maximum limits enforced by speed limits, for example trucks.

Classification

Administration 

Responsibility for the road network differs between trunk and non-trunk routes. Trunk roads, which are the most important roads, are administered by the Ministry of Transport. The classifications of A and B roads are independent of their width and quality. Some B roads are wide enough to accommodate bidirectional traffic, while others are narrower with various passing locations. B roads follow the same numbering scheme as A roads, but almost always have 3- and 4- digit designation.

A roads 
A roads are highways and other major roads.

B roads 
B roads are distributor roads, which see less traffic than A roads.

Motorways 

Motorways in Botswana have a set of restrictions, which prohibit certain traffic from using the road. The following classes of traffic are not allowed on Botswana motorways:

 Learner drivers
 Slow vehicles (i.e., not capable of reaching 60km/h on a level road).
 Invalid carriages (lightweight three-wheeled vehicles)
 Pedestrians
 Pedal-cycles (bicycles, etc.)
 Vehicles under 50cc (e.g., mopeds)
 Tractors
 Animals

Rules for driving on motorways include the following:

 The keep-left rule applies unless overtaking
 No stopping at any time
 No reversing
 No hitchhiking
 Only vehicles that travel faster than 80km/h may use the outside lane
 No driving on the hard-shoulder

The general motorway speed limit is 120km/h.

Signage 

Signage on the Botswana network conforms broadly to Southern Africa norms, though a number of signs omit Southern Africa route numbers. All length distances are shown in kilometers, speed is in kilometers per hour whilst height and width restrictions are required to be shown in feet and inches (though the metric measurements may optionally also appear).

Traditionally, road signs in Botswana used blue backgrounds rather than the yellow, white, or orange that the rest of the world uses on traffic warning signs. In the early 2010s, officials announced plans to begin phasing out the distinctive blue signs in favor of more typical signs in order to be more in line with the neighboring Southern African Development Community member states.

See also 

 Botswana
 Transport in Botswana

References

External links 
 UN Map of Botswana
 Air Botswana UK - The national airline of Botswana

Botswana
Transport in Botswana